The 2017 Individual Speedway World Championship Grand Prix Qualification was a series of motorcycle speedway meetings that were used to determine the three riders that qualified for the 2017 Speedway Grand Prix. The series consisted of four qualifying rounds at Terenzano, Slangerup, King's Lynn and Abensberg, two semi-finals at Goričan and Lonigo and then the Grand Prix Challenge at Vetlanda.  The three riders that qualified were Patryk Dudek, Martin Vaculík and Fredrik Lindgren.

Qualifying rounds

Semi-finals

Final

See also 
 2016 Speedway Grand Prix

References 

2016 in speedway
2017 Speedway Grand Prix
Speedway Grand Prix Qualifications